Mangalyapattu is an Indian television series which launched on Mazhavil Manorama channel by 19 September 2016.

The series airs from Monday to Friday at 8 P.M IST.
Mangalyapattu is a story of a village girl, Myna, whose family relied on weaving for their livelihood. The story sheds light on the struggles, hardships and dreams of a mediocre weaver family and also brings out the flamboyance of the competitive textile industry.
It completed 120 episodes and was replaced by dubbed version of Suryaputra Karn.

Plot
Myna is the sole bread-winner of the family of four, consisting of her father Achuthan, her two siblings Abhirami and Kannan and her grandmother. Being the eldest of the three, Myna took upon her young shoulders the burden of the family. She is working as a sales girl at a leading textile shop in the city. The story unfolds when Achu decide to takeup the order to weave a 'Mangalyapattu' worth five lakh.

Trivia
This was the last serial of Malayalam actor Jagannatha Varma, who died on 20 December 2016, during the shooting of the serial. He played the role of Rajan Kartha.

Cast 

 Rini Raj  as Maina
 Rudra Pratap  as Achuthan
Sona Nair as Chandana Shetty / Lakshmi
 Charmila / Gayathri Lakshmi as Menaka
 Dileep Shankar as Mohan Kartha
 Akshara .S.P as Rubi
 Jagannatha Varma as Rajan Kartha
Richard N. J. as Renjith Kartha
Ranjith Raj as Denny Mathew
Manu Varma as Mathachan
 Jameela Malik as Achuthan's mother
Master Arjun as Kannan
Arya Sreeram  as Hema
Mini as Radha chechi
Seena as Sony
Renjini as Sulu
Jeevan Gopal as Arjun
Meenakshy as Mini chechi 
Baby Neelima as  Chinnu
Feroz Aftab as Pisharady mashu
Reji Nair as Sabu Mashu
Thirumala Ramachandran as Velayudan
Vijayan as Chandrettan
Ajay Sankar
Muhammed Shahin 
Gireesh Kumar as Doctor

Noorin Shereef as Abhirami

External links 
 Official Website

References 

2016 Indian television series debuts
Malayalam-language television shows
Mazhavil Manorama original programming